Església de Sant Pere del Serrat  is a church located in El Serrat, Ordino Parish, Andorra. It is a heritage property registered in the Cultural Heritage of Andorra. It was built in the 16th-17th century.

References

Ordino
Roman Catholic churches in Andorra
Cultural Heritage of Andorra